The Lahu Democratic Union (abbreviated LDU) is a Lahu political and insurgent group in Myanmar. It signed the Nationwide Ceasefire Agreement (NCA) with the government of Myanmar on 13 February 2018. The LDU is part of the United Nationalities Federal Council (UNFC) and its military coalition, the Federal Union Army (FUA).

References

Paramilitary organisations based in Myanmar
Political parties in Myanmar
Rebel groups in Myanmar